Daniel Bloyou (born 18 April 2000) is a Ghanaian footballer.

Career

Youth, College & Amateur
Bloyou was born in Accra, Ghana, but moved to Philadelphia in the United States, going on to play five seasons with the Philadelphia Union academy.

In 2018, Bloyou attended Old Dominion University to play college soccer. He went on to make 32 appearances for the Monarchs over two seasons. In 2020, Bloyou transferred to Pennsylvania State University and played a further two seasons, scoring 12 goals goals and tallying nine assists in 33 appearances. In his senior season, he was named to the United Soccer Coaches Third Team All-American, earned first-team All-Big Ten honors, and was named to the Big Ten All-Tournament Team for scoring three goals and one assist in three games.

While at college, Bloyou played in the USL League Two, spending 2019 with Reading United AC and 2021 with Philadelphia Lone Star.

MLS SuperDraft
On 11 January 2022, Bloyou was selected 75th overall in the 2022 MLS SuperDraft by Atlanta United.

Professional

FC Tucson
On 8 March 2022, Bloyou signed his first professional contract, joining USL League One club FC Tucson. He made his debut on 2 April, starting in a 4–0 loss to Richmond Kickers.

Ljungskile SK
On 22 July 2022, Tucson loaned Bloyou to Ljungskile SK.

References

2000 births
Living people
Association football forwards
Atlanta United FC draft picks
Ghanaian footballers
Ghanaian expatriate footballers
Ghanaian expatriate sportspeople in the United States
Expatriate soccer players in the United States
Old Dominion Monarchs men's soccer players
Penn State Nittany Lions men's soccer players
Reading United A.C. players
Soccer players from Philadelphia
FC Tucson players
USL League One players
USL League Two players
Ghanaian expatriate sportspeople in Sweden
Expatriate footballers in Sweden
Ljungskile SK players